History Lessens is the second compilation album by British folk metal band Skyclad. Its full title is History Lessens – An Introduction to the Artist.

Track listing
Penny Dreadful (Full Shilling Mix) - 3:10
The Silver Cloud's Dark Lining - 3:21
Isle of Jura - 3:59
No Deposit, No Return - 4:30
Brimstone Ballet - 4:13
Constance Eternal - 5:52
Building a Ruin - 3:59
Emerald - 3:35
I Dubious - 3:12
Jumping My Shadow - 5:27
A Bellyful of Emptiness - 4:56
Kiss My Sweet Brass - :31
Bury Me - 4:37
Single Phial - 6:07
By George - 1:46

Skyclad (band) albums
2002 compilation albums
Massacre Records compilation albums